The Baiounitai or Vayunites were a Sclavene (South Slavic) tribe which settled the region of Macedonia at the end of 6th century. The Baiounitai initially settled in the region west of Thessalonica. They belonged to a group of Slavic tribes that unsuccessfully tried to capture the city at the beginning of the 7th century, after which they are believed to have migrated to the region of northern Epirus, between Ioannina in Greece and Himara in modern Albania.

In the 6th century many Slavic tribes populated the wider region around the Byzantine city of Thessalonica. In ca. 614–616 the Baiounitai are mentioned in the Miracles of Saint Demetrius as one of them. Their territory was on the western side of Thessalonica. The territory inhabited by the Baiounitai formed a Sclavinia. In ca. 614–616 the Baiounitai and other neighbouring Slavic tribes united under a leader named Chatzon and besieged the city. Forces composed of many different Slavic tribes attacked the city with siege engines trying to break through the city walls, while their small and manoeuvrable dugouts attacked the city from the sea. Their efforts failed and Chatzon was killed after entering the city to negotiate. After this failure to capture Thessalonica, many members of the defeated Slavic tribes moved further from the city. According to some, the Baiounitai moved from Macedonia to the territory of Epirus, and settled the region north of Ioannina.

Some connect the region of Thesprotia, known as Vagenetia up until the 1270s, to the tribe. Two personal seals of archons of Vagenetia have been found, that of spatharios Theodoros dated to the 7th or 8th century, and that of protospatharios Hilarion dated to the late 9th and early 10th century. Similar toponyms like Viyanite or Viyantije survived until the 16th century when they were replaced with the name Delvinë which also became an official name of the Ottoman sanjak of Delvina. The territory around the river Aoös (or Vjosë, today in southern Albania) was probably also named after this tribe.

Annotations

References

Sources

 
 
 
 
 
 
 

Sclaveni
Medieval Epirus
Medieval Macedonia
Slavic tribes in Macedonia
Medieval Albania
Thesprotia